Andrew Grant (born 1968 in Birmingham, England) is a British writer, and the younger brother of bestselling thriller writer Lee Child. Grant is in the process of taking over the writing of Lee Child's Jack Reacher series of thrillers, writing under the new pseudonym Andrew Child.

Career
Andrew Grant was born in Birmingham, England. He studied at St Albans School, Hertfordshire, before going on to study Drama and English Literature at the University of Sheffield, and stayed in Sheffield after graduating. Grant founded a theatre company that produced original material, culminating with a critically successful appearance at the Edinburgh Festival Fringe. Following his foray into theatre, cash flow issues made it necessary for him to find other employment, and he spent fifteen years working in telecommunications before leaving the corporate world to become a novelist.

He wrote his first novel in 2008, Even, published in 2009, followed by two further novels, Die Twice and More Harm Than Good, all featuring David Trevellyan, a Royal Naval intelligence officer. 
His debut novel, Even, received stars from both Library Journal and Publishers Weekly.  He also wrote a book series featuring Cooper Devereaux, a detective in Birmingham, Alabama, starting with False Positive, released in 2015.  This is followed by two books featuring Paul McGrath, starting with Invisible in 2019.

In January 2020, Grant's brother Lee Child announced that he intended to retire from writing the Jack Reacher book series, with Grant taking over. Child intended to write the next few books together with Grant before passing the series entirely over to him. Grant is writing under the new pen name Andrew Child.

Personal life
In 2010, Grant married novelist Tasha Alexander after meeting her in the crime fiction convention Bouchercon in Baltimore in 2008.  They lived in Chicago for a number of years before moving to Tie Siding, Wyoming.

Grant is a supporter of Aston Villa. A number of his books feature characters with names borrowed from footballers who played for the club, including Paul McGrath.

Grant is the younger brother of author James Dover Grant, a.k.a. Lee Child.

Bibliography

David Trevellyan
 1. Even – (2009)
 2. Die Twice – (2010)
 3. More Harm Than Good – (2012)

Detective Cooper Devereaux
 1. False Positive – (2015)
 2. False Friend – (2017)
 3. False Witness – (2018)

Paul McGrath
 1. Invisible – (2019)
 2. Too Close to Home – (2020)

Jack Reacher
 25. The Sentinel – (2020)
 26. Better Off Dead  – (2021)
 27. No Plan B – (2022)
 28. The Secret – (2023)

Standalone novels
 1. Run – (2014)

References

External links
 Official website

British writers
English thriller writers
English crime fiction writers
1968 births
Living people